Roy W. Wynne (March 23, 1894 – September 22, 1977) was an American football and basketball coach.  He served as the head football coach at Chadron State College from 1925 to 1926 and Washburn University from 1927 to 1928, compiling a career college football coaching record  of 18–18.  Wynne was also the head basketball coach at Chadron State from 1925 to 1927 and at Washburn from 1927 to 1930, tallying a career college basketball coaching record of 45–38.

Coaching career
Wynne the 19th head football coach at Washburn University in Topeka, Kansas, a position he held for two seasons, from 1927 until 1928, compiling a  record of 3–14.

Head coaching record

Football

References

External links
 

1894 births
1977 deaths
Basketball coaches from Kansas
Chadron State Eagles football coaches
Chadron State Eagles men's basketball coaches
Washburn Ichabods athletic directors
Washburn Ichabods football coaches
Washburn Ichabods men's basketball coaches
Ottawa University alumni